WLAF may refer to:

WLAF (AM), an AM radio station in the US state of Tennessee
World League of American Football, later NFL Europe and NFL Europa, a European league of American football which played from 1991-92 and 1995-2007
Women League of American Football, Russian league of American football